Brookhouse School (also known as Brookhouse International School) is an independent British curriculum co-educational day and boarding school that offers early years, preparatory and secondary schooling. The first and main campus is located in Langata, a suburb of Nairobi. The Runda Campus off Kiambu Road was opened in 2017.

Academics
Brookhouse follows the National Curriculum for England and students take IGCSE and A-Level at 16+ and 18+, respectively. Students take examinations through both the Cambridge International Examinations (CIE) and Edexcel Boards.

Curriculum

The school is a British national System admitting students from 2yrs to 18 yrs. Brookhouse Schools also offers an international foundation year bridging programme in partnership with the Northern Consortium of UK Universities (NCUK).

Extracurricular activities
Brookhouse School offers a large programme of extra-curricular activities, including a wide range of sports and trips. Examples of activities regularly offered at Brookhouse are:
Round Square Community Service projects
President's Award Scheme
Model United Nations
LAMDA, drama, debating and verse speaking
Choir, orchestra and other ensemble musical groups
Individual musical instrument tuition
Camping and outdoor adventure activities
Environment and wildlife clubs
Horse-riding, archery and Martial Arts clubs
Aerobics and Gym
Desktop publishing and magazine production
Electronics, Robotics and Science Discovery
First Aid
Chess and Board Games
Various craft and cooking clubs

Reputation
The school was selected for review by the Good Schools Guide International and is a member of the prestigious G20 Schools. The school is fully accredited by the Council of International Schools (CIS) and the Independent Association of Preparatory Schools (IAPS).

Alumni
The Brookhouse community (alumni and staff) includes:
Dr. Louise Leakey, palaeontologist, educator and lecturer
E-Sir (1981–2003), musician
Eric Wainaina, musician and playwright
Nikita Kering, musician

References

External links

Official website

High schools and secondary schools in Kenya
Schools in Nairobi
International schools in Kenya
1981 establishments in Kenya
Educational institutions established in 1981
Private schools in Kenya
Kenya
Elementary and primary schools in Kenya
Boarding schools in Kenya